Baridi (also Romanized as Barīdī) is a village in Surak Rural District, Lirdaf District, Jask County, Hormozgan Province, Iran. At the 2006 census, its population was 40, in 10 families.

References 

Populated places in Jask County